Disorder6 is a suspense visual novel video game developed and published by 5pb. for the PlayStation 3 and Xbox 360. The game is a sequel to Dunamis15 in Suspense-fiction Adventure series, and it was released in Japan on August 22, 2013, featuring six chapters and 8 endings.

Synopsis
Disorder6 is set in the same world as Dunamis15, and uses similar gameplay. The game has six chapters, each going through memories from the perspective of a main character.

Characters
 

The main character of the game. An indecisive boy who has a weak will, he has just lost his memories.

The main heroine and the girl who is chained to Jō. Just like Jō, she has just lost her memory. A girl who wears punk-rock style clothing, she has multiple personality disorder and isn't aware of these personalities.

An aggressive sadist, she treats everyone and especially Jō as her servants, to the point of even making him go onto the ground so she could walk on him.

The male personality. He has a snobbish personality and has the tendency to punch anyone who annoys him, even if it's a woman.

The young child personality. She acts completely like a spoiled and selfish 5-year-old. Although really energetic, she begins to act violently when she gets hungry.

A lethargic taciturn. She always mutters negative things and has a really quiet voice to the point of people thinking she doesn't even exist.

Head of her family, Hinako is a woman with red hair. She is also a co-worker of Jō's.

Reception

Famitsu gave the game their silver award.

Notes

References

External links 
  
 

2013 video games
Japan-exclusive video games
Suspense-fiction Adventure
PlayStation 3 games
Xbox 360 games
Video games developed in Japan
Visual novels